Russvatnet is a lake in Vågå Municipality in Innlandet county, Norway. The  lake is located in the Jotunheimen mountain range and also within Jotunheimen National Park. It lies in a U-shaped valley between the mountains Surtningssue, Nautgardstinden, and Besshø.

See also
List of lakes in Norway

References

Vågå
Lakes of Innlandet